The UWF Super Welterweight Championship was a title in the Japanese professional wrestling, created by Universal Pro/FULL, then later on defended in Michinoku Pro and Osaka Pro before becoming inactive.

Inaugural tournament
The inaugural tournament to crown the first champion was held on June 14 and June 15, 1992. It was a four-man tournament.

Title history

See also
Osaka Pro Wrestling Championship

References

External links
History at Wrestling-Titles.com

Super welterweight wrestling championships
Osaka Pro Wrestling championships